Fibro may refer to:

A term for asbestos cement
Trade name of a viscose fibre made by Courtaulds
Fibromyalgia, medical condition
Fibro System AB, Swedish test equipment company